The De Brys were a family of artisans noted for their engraving:

 Thiry de Bry (1495–1590), goldsmith in Liège
 Theodor de Bry (1528-1598), engraver, goldsmith, editor and publisher born in Liège, son of Thiry de Bry
 Johann Theodor de Bry (1561–1623), engraver and publisher born in Strasbourg, son of Theodor de Bry
 Lucas Jennis (1590–1630), German engraver, step-nephew of Theodor de Bry

See also
 Jean-Antoine-Joseph de Bry or Jean Debry (1760–1834), President of France's National Convention in 1793
 Bry (disambiguation)

Belgian families